The Australian cricket team played 34 first-class matches in England in 1896, including 3 Tests.

Test series
England won the Test series 2–1.

First Test

Second Test

Third Test

Ceylon
As on previous voyages to England, the Australians had a stopover in Colombo and played a match on 1 April at Galle Face Green against a Ceylon team, which was drawn.

References

External links
 CricketArchive – tour summaries

Annual reviews
 James Lillywhite's Cricketers' Annual (Red Lilly) 1897
 Wisden Cricketers' Almanack 1897

Further reading
 Bill Frindall, The Wisden Book of Test Cricket 1877-1978, Wisden, 1979
 Chris Harte, A History of Australian Cricket, Andre Deutsch, 1993
 Ray Robinson, On Top Down Under, Cassell, 1975

1896 in Australian cricket
1896 in English cricket
1896 in Ceylon
International cricket competitions from 1888–89 to 1918
1896
1896
English cricket seasons in the 19th century
Sri Lankan cricket seasons from 1880–81 to 1971–72
1896
1896 sports events in London